Peeping Tom is the only studio album by American band Peeping Tom. It was released by Ipecac Recordings on May 30, 2006. It peaked at number 103 on the Billboard 200 chart.

Production 
In 2000, Mike Patton conceived Peeping Tom. It is a tribute to Michael Powell's 1960 film Peeping Tom. The album was created by swapping song files through the mail with collaborators such as Norah Jones, Kool Keith, and Massive Attack, among others. It took almost six years to complete the album.

Musical style and influences

The musical style of Peeping Tom encompasses rock, heavy metal, experimental pop, pop, trip hop, alternative hip hop, underground hip hop and hip hop.

Patton said of the album; "This is my version of pop music. In a way, this is an exercise for me: taking all these things I've learned over the years and putting them into a pop format."

Release 
"Mojo" was released as a single from the album. It is accompanied by a music video, directed by Matt McDermitt and featuring appearances by Danny DeVito, Mark Hoppus, Rachel Hunter, and Dan the Automator.

The album was released by Patton's own record label Ipecac Recordings on May 30, 2006. The vinyl version was released by Anticon on August 28, 2006.

Critical reception 

At Metacritic, which assigns a weighted average score out of 100 to reviews from mainstream critics, the album received an average score of 64 based on 22 reviews, indicating "generally favorable reviews".

David Raposa of Pitchfork gave the album a 6.2 out of 10, saying: "For all the great ideas and fantastic moments sprinkled throughout Peeping Tom, it turns out that Mike Patton's idea of pop is as uncompromising as his other musical notions." Cammila Collar of AllMusic gave the album 4.5 stars out of 5, calling it "Patton's most accessible work since Mr. Bungle's 1999 album California."

Track listing

Charts

References

External links 
 
 

2006 debut albums
Anticon albums
Ipecac Recordings albums
Peeping Tom (band) albums
Albums produced by Dan the Automator
Albums produced by Jel (music producer)
Albums produced by Odd Nosdam

fr:Peeping Tom (groupe)#Peeping Tom (album, 2006)